Severo Córdova (November 8, 1892 – January 1974), nicknamed "Pete", was a Cuban infielder in the Cuban League and Negro leagues in the 1910s and 1920s.

A native of Havana, Cuba, Córdova played in the Cuban League for San Francisco Park in 1915–1916. He went on to play in the Negro leagues for the Kansas City Monarchs in 1921 and the Cleveland Tate Stars in 1923. Córdova died in Philadelphia, Pennsylvania in 1974 at age 81.

References

External links
 and Baseball-Reference Black Baseball stats and Seamheads

1892 births
1974 deaths
Cleveland Tate Stars players
Kansas City Monarchs players
San Francisco Park players
Baseball infielders
Baseball players from Havana